The 1944–45 season was the 45th season in the history of Berner Sport Club Young Boys. The team played their home games at Stadion Wankdorf in Bern.

Overview
Young Boys achieved a third place finish in the Nationalliga and reached the finals of the Swiss Cup where they beat FC St. Gallen 2-0 on April 2, 1945. The club started strong in the Nationalliga season, keeping their non-losing streak for 16 consecutive games before losing 2-1 to FC Biel-Bienne. The team's top scorer was Eugen "Genia" Walaschek who ended the season with 11 goals.

Players
 Maurice Glur
 Hans Flühmann
 Louis Gobet
 Albert Stoll
 Eugène Walaschek
 Hans Liniger
 Fritz Knecht
 Walter Streun
 Hans Trachsel
 Willy Bernhard
 José Puigventos

Friendlies

Competitions

Overall record

Nationalliga A

League table

Matches

Swiss Cup

References

BSC Young Boys seasons
Swiss football clubs 1944–45 season